"It's Not Over" is a song by Australian pop group, The Rockmelons featuring Deni Hines. The song was released in August 1992 as the third single from their second studio album, Form 1 Planet (1992). The single peaked at number 15 in Australia, becoming the group's third consecutive top 20 single.

Track listing
CD single (D16037)
 "It's Not Over" (Radio Edit) - 4:05
 "What's It Gonna Be" - 4:45
 "It's Not Over" (Accapella)	- 6:25

Vinyl single (X 14397)  
A1 "It's Not Over"	
A2 "It's Not Over" (Radio Edit)	
A3 "It's Not Over" (Accapella)	
B1 "Love's Gonna Bring You Home" (Club Edit)	
B2 "Love's Gonna Bring You Home" (Dub)	
B3 "Love's Gonna Bring You Home" (Instrumental)

Weekly charts

References

External links
 The Rockmelons "It's Not Over" - master

1992 songs
1992 singles
Mushroom Records singles